The Politics of Rivers State function within the framework of a presidential republic, with the Governor of Rivers State as both head of state and head of government. Rivers State is known for a politically engaged citizenry. The official seat of government is in Port Harcourt. Under the Constitution, Executive power is vested in the Governor. This does not change the fact that such authority may also be exercised through the Deputy Governor or Commissioners. Legislative power is vested in a 32-member unicameral House of Assembly. Judicial power is exercised solely by the judiciary of Rivers State.

Political institutions
As with the federal government of Nigeria, power in Rivers State is divided into three main branches: executive, legislative, and judicial.

Executive
The Executive branch of government in Rivers State is part of the government that is responsible for the daily administration of the state. The Executive branch consists mainly of executive council, ministries and various parastatals. It is headed by the Governor, who is both the chief of state and head of government. The governor is elected in the same manner as the President to no more than two consecutive four-year terms.

Each of the ministries is led by a Commissioner appointed by the Governor. Rivers State House of Assembly has the duty to confirm the Governor's appointments. Though parastatals have heads also appointed by the Governor, they are overseen by ministries run by Perm Secs who report to Commissioners.

|Governor
|Ezenwo N. Wike
|People's Democratic Party
|29 May 2015
|-
|Deputy Governor
|Ipalibo Banigo
|People's Democratic Party
|29 May 2015
|}

Legislative
The legislative powers in the state lie with the Rivers State House of Assembly. A unicameral body of 32 members elected every four years. The Assembly is presided over by a Speaker, assisted by other Principal Officers. All of whom are elected from among the House membership by the legislators.

Following general elections in April 2015, the current House of Assembly was formed. People's Democratic Party (PDP) emerged as the largest party with 31 seats. Members of the House of the Assembly are elected from single-member constituencies. The 8th House of Assembly was inaugurated on 1 June 2015.

Judicial

Rivers State has an independent judiciary, which interprets and applies the law in the state. It is composed of a number of courts, each specialized for a different task. Most judicial appointments including that of Chief Judge are made by the Governor, but acting upon the recommendation of the National Judicial Council. As the third arm, the judiciary plays a stabilizing role in the affairs of polity. It is equipped to adjudicate disputes between people or the government at various levels. Presently, there are 10 judicial divisions within the High Court of Justice, and about 26 judges carrying out their professional work.

Political parties and elections

The main political players are the People's Democratic Party and the All Progressives Congress. These parties along with several minor ones put forward candidates for elections to the executive, legislative and local government councils. People's Democratic Party has been the most influential political party since 1999. It continues to maintain control of top statewide offices, including the governorship.

Local government
At local level, the state is divided into local government areas. There are 23 LGAs that handle local administration under an elected Chairman or Mayor. Each of the local government areas has its own administrative seat and is further split into wards. Council elections are organized through the Rivers State Independent Electoral Commission.

See also
Rivers State People's Democratic Party
Governor of Rivers State
Rivers State House of Assembly
Nigerian National Assembly delegation from Rivers

References